John Joseph Rapacz (April 25, 1924 – January 2, 1991) was an American football offensive lineman in the National Football League for the New York Giants.  He also played in the All-America Football Conference for the Chicago Rockets/Hornets.  Rapacz played college football at the University of Oklahoma, where he was an All-American, and was drafted in the third round of the 1947 NFL Draft by the Boston Yanks. After retiring from the NFL Rapacz went on to become a Michigan High School Hall of Fame football coach for Hackett Catholic Central High School.

External links
In 1954 John was traded to the Baltimore Colts.  He retired at the end of the 1955 season.  He returned to college, finished his degree, became a teacher and Football coach at Hackett Catholic High School.
 Profile on NFL.com

1924 births
1991 deaths
American football offensive linemen
Chicago Rockets players
Chicago Hornets players
New York Giants players
Oklahoma Sooners football players